John Harper (born 1883) was a Scottish professional footballer who played as an outside right.

Career
Born in Ayrshire, Harper played for Maybole and Bradford City.

For Bradford City he made 2 appearances in the Football League.

Sources

References

1883 births
Year of death missing
Scottish footballers
Maybole F.C. players
Bradford City A.F.C. players
English Football League players
Association football outside forwards